CAPE-1 (Cajun Advanced Picosatellite Experiment) is an amateur miniaturized satellite developed by students at the University of Louisiana at Lafayette. The CubeSat was launched successfully into orbit at the Baikonur Cosmodrome in Kazakhstan in April 2007 after a delay of several weeks.

An amateur radio frequency in the 70-centimeter band was used during the satellite's operation. Intermittent continuous wave and AX.25 telemetry beacons were sent at one watt with the call sign K5USL.  CAPE-1 has ceased operation, and is succeeded by the CAPE-2 picosatellite, a 1U Cubesat operating on the 2-meter and 70-centimeter bands.

See also 

List of CubeSats
CAPE-2

References

External links
  

University of Louisiana at Lafayette
Student satellites
Spacecraft launched in 2007
CubeSats
Amateur radio satellites
Spacecraft launched by Dnepr rockets